SMS Camäleon was the lead ship of the  of steam-powered gunboats of the Prussian Navy (later the Imperial German Navy) that was launched in 1860. A small vessel, armed with only three light guns, Camäleon saw little active use. She served during the Second Schleswig War of 1864 and the Franco-Prussian War of 1870–1871, but saw no action in either conflict. Her peacetime career was limited to survey work in 1865 and limited tender duties in and around Kiel in 1867–1868. In poor condition by 1872, she was stricken from the naval register and used as a storage hulk in Kiel. She was broken up for scrap some time after 1878.

Design

She displaced  at full load. The ship's crew consisted of 4 officers and 67 enlisted men. As built, she was equipped with a three-masted schooner rig. The ship was armed with a battery of one rifled  24-pounder muzzle-loading gun and two rifled  12-pounder muzzle-loading guns.

Service history

The keel for Camäleon was laid down in September 1859 at the Königliche Werft (Royal Shiypard) in Danzig, and she was officially named on 18 October. The ship was launched on 4 August 1860, the first member of her class. Since the initial sea trials that were conducted by the shipyard proved to be unsatisfactory, commissioning of the ship was delayed from the originally scheduled date of 23 June 1861 to 6 August. The tour was commanded by Korvettenkapitän (Corvette Captain) Hans Kuhn, who flew his flag in Camäleon. After the stop in Skagen, the corvette  and the schooner Hela joined the flotilla of gunboats. While on their way back to Prussia in September, they stopped in Lübeck. After arriving back in Danzig, Camäleon was decommissioned. The ship had not been able to reach her designed speed on the cruise, so AG Vulcan had to make modifications to the engine at its own expense.

Camäleon remained laid up until the outbreak of the Second Schleswig War in February 1864, when she was mobilized into the coastal defense flotilla. In August and September, Camäleon and much of the Prussian fleet visited the Baltic Sea ports of the conquered territories of Schleswig and Holstein; at the end of September, she began a survey of the Holstein coast that lasted into October. Camäleon was employed in the area of Hörup Haff and Alsen. At the end of March 1865, the Reserve Division was dissolved. Camäleon was sent to assist the corvette , which had run aground in the Fehmarn Belt, but Camäleon herself ran aground off Friedrichsort while en route. After being pulled free, she was transferred to the Jade Bay to conduct survey work with Comet and the aviso . In September, Camäleon was assigned to the gunnery school along with the old frigate . Camäleon served in the gunnery school briefly, before being decommissioned at Dänholm on 1 December. At some point in 1865, the boat's 24-pounder was replaced with a rifled  68-pounder gun.

The ship remained out of service during the Austro-Prussian War of 1866, and next saw active duty in 1867, when she was recommissioned on 12 March for service as a tender in Kiel. On 15 October, she retrieved the main anchor from the corvette , which had been lost during an emergency anchoring. Camäleon remained in Kiel through 1868. During this period, she towed the steamer  and carried a 75-pounder gun to the coastal fortification on Friedrichsort on 30 March. On 16 April and 25 May, Prince Adalbert of Prussia came aboard to visit the ship. She carried Prince Friedrich Karl of Prussia to Sonderburg on 15–16 June. A boiler explosion that destroyed one of her boilers forced her decommissioning on 26 August for repairs. She remained laid up until the outbreak of the Franco-Prussian War in July 1870. She was stationed as a guard ship off Friedrichsort for the duration of the conflict. On 1 April 1871, with the war all but over, Camäleon was decommissioned again. She was stricken from the naval register on 19 March 1872, owing to her poor condition. The ship was used as a harbor vessel in Kiel, and later converted into a coal storage hulk. While in Kiel, parts of the ship were removed for use in the reconstruction of  her sister Cyclop. Camäleon was broken up for scrap some time after 1878, but the exact date is not known.

Notes

References
 
 
 

1860 ships
Camäleon-class gunboats
Ships built in Danzig